Dahlen is a Low German surname variation of Dahl originating in medieval Westphalia. Dahlen is also a common Scandinavian surname. The Swedish language spelling replaces the e with é, indicator of an integrated loan word. Dahlen is uncommon as a given name. Notable people with the surname include:

Andreas Dahlén, Swedish footballer
Bill Dahlen (1870–1950), American baseball player
Carl Dahlén  (1770–1851), Swedish ballet dancer and choreographer
 Jonathan Dahlen (born 1997), Swedish ice hockey player
Neal Dahlen, American football manager
Ulf Dahlén (born 1967), Swedish ice hockey player
Hermann, Freiherr Dahlen von Orlaburg (1828–1887), Austrian governor of Bosnia and Herzegovina

References